The  is a private music conservatory in Tachikawa, Tokyo, Japan. Founded in 1926 as the Tokyo Conservatory of Music, Kunitachi now offers study programs in performance, music education, composition, computer music, and musicology, for bachelor's degree, post-bachelor's diploma, master's degree, and doctorate. It has signed cooperation agreements with notable music schools around the world, such as Geneva University of Music, California Institute of Arts, among others.

Notable alumni
Masamichi Amano, composer
Ahn Eak-tai, composer and conductor
Masashi Fujimoto, actor, singer, musician, and entertainer
Okuda Hiroko, inventor and composer
Kohmi Hirose, singer
Joe Hisaishi, composer and director
Masato Honda, saxophonist and multi-instrumentalist
Yukihiro Ikeda, tubist
Ichiyo Izawa, pianist of Tokyo Jihen; frontman of Appa; dropped out
Motohiro Kawashima, composer
Mayumi Miyata, shō player
Michiru Oshima, composer
Nozomi Takeuchi, gravure idol
Yōsuke Yamashita, jazz pianist
Seiji Yokoyama, composer
Mimori Yusa, singer-songwriter
Maiko Iuchi, composer
Kazumi Totaka, composer and voice actor
Ooi Takashi, jazz vibraphonist
Masahiro Sayama, jazz pianist; member of Prism
 Mari Iijima, composer, voice actor, writer, model and singer

References

External links
Kunitachi College of Music official site

Educational institutions established in 1926
Tachikawa, Tokyo
Kunitachi College of Music
1926 establishments in Japan